Carlo Russolillo (born 17 March 1957) is an Italian boxer. He competed in the men's lightweight event at the 1980 Summer Olympics.

References

External links
 

1957 births
Living people
Italian male boxers
Olympic boxers of Italy
Boxers at the 1980 Summer Olympics
Sportspeople from Genoa
Mediterranean Games silver medalists for Italy
Mediterranean Games medalists in boxing
Competitors at the 1979 Mediterranean Games
Lightweight boxers